Huanacune (possibly from Aymara wanaku, wanaqu guanaco, -ni Aymara suffix to indicate ownership, "the one with the guanaco") is a mountain in the Vilcanota mountain range in the Andes of Peru, about  high. It is situated in the Cusco Region, Canchis Province, Checacupe District. Huanacune lies northwest of the glaciated area of Quelccaya (Quechua for "snow plain"), southwest of Unollocsina and Millo. Tallacunca is to the southwest.

References 

Mountains of Cusco Region
Mountains of Peru